Brian Michael Downey (born 27 January 1951) is an Irish drummer. He was a founding member of the rock band Thin Lizzy and the only other constant in the band aside from leader Phil Lynott until their disbandment in 1983. Downey also co-wrote several Thin Lizzy songs. Allmusic critic Eduardo Rivadavia has argued that Downey is "certainly one of the most underrated [rock drummers] of his generation".

Career

Growing up in Crumlin, Dublin, Brian's early musical influences came from his father who played in a local pipe band and loved jazz, and also from his 1960s heroes: The Kinks, The Beatles and The Rolling Stones. In his youth, Downey met friend, co-founder and bass guitarist Phil Lynott, who attended the same school. Before forming Thin Lizzy, Downey had been in numerous school bands, beginning with The Liffey Beats, Mod Con Cave Dwellers, and briefly The Black Eagles (with Lynott). He moved on to performing in a local band, Sugar Shack, and then was persuaded by Lynott to join him in another band, Orphanage. Upon meeting guitarist Eric Bell, the trio formed Thin Lizzy. Although the line-up of musicians within the band changed over the years, with the exception of Lynott, for the next thirteen years Downey remained the only other permanent member of the band, as well as drumming on Lynott's solo albums.
 
After Lynott's death in 1986, Downey played in the tribute Thin Lizzy line-up with John Sykes, Scott Gorham, Darren Wharton and Marco Mendoza, but had been absent from subsequent Thin Lizzy touring bands. After Sykes' departure from the group in 2009, guitarist Scott Gorham created another line-up of Thin Lizzy. Downey, Mendoza and Wharton rejoined, along with two new members: Def Leppard guitarist Vivian Campbell and former vocalist from The Almighty, Ricky Warwick. This version of Thin Lizzy started an extensive world tour in January 2010 and continued to tour until early 2013, with new permanent guitarist Damon Johnson eventually replacing Richard Fortus. Gorham had stated that the band members were considering recording new material, and this project eventually emerged under the Black Star Riders name, with which Downey chose not to be involved due to the pressures of consistent touring.
 
Downey was a guest at the unveiling of Lynott's statue in 2005, and drummed for Gary Moore at the tribute concert that followed. Downey also appeared on Moore's 2007 album, Close As You Get, and subsequent tour.

In early 2016, Downey formed a trio, later four-piece band called Brian Downey's Alive and Dangerous. The band consists of Downey, bassist/lead vocalist Matt Wilson, guitarist/vocalist Brian Grace and guitarist/vocalist Phil Edgar. They tour Europe and perform primarily Thin Lizzy songs.

Discography

With Thin Lizzy

Thin Lizzy (1971)
Shades of a Blue Orphanage (1972)
Vagabonds of the Western World (1973)
Nightlife (1974)
Fighting (1975)
Jailbreak (1976)
Johnny the Fox (1976)
Bad Reputation (1977)
Live and Dangerous (1978)
Black Rose: A Rock Legend (1979)
Chinatown (1980)
Renegade (1981)
Thunder and Lightning (1983)
Life (1983)

Other albums
Funky Junction – A Tribute to Deep Purple (1973)
Gary Moore – Back on the Streets (1978)
Phil Lynott – Solo in Soho (1980)
Phil Lynott – The Philip Lynott Album (1982)
John Sykes – "Please Don't Leave Me" (1982)
Various Artists – Straight to Hell (1987)
The Baby Snakes – Sweet Hunger (1988)
Don Baker – Almost Illegal (1989)
Gary Moore – After the War (1989)
Gary Moore – Still Got the Blues (1990)
Spirit Nation – Spirit Nation (1992)
Blues Up Front – All the Way from Dublin (1999)
Gary Moore – Close as You Get (2007)

References

1951 births
Living people
Irish rock drummers
Irish drummers
Male drummers
Irish session musicians
Musicians from County Dublin
Thin Lizzy members
The Gary Moore Band members
Mercury Records artists
Decca Records artists
Grand Slam (band) members